IACM may refer to:

 International Association for Cannabinoid Medicines 
 Mozambican Civil Aviation Institute